Township 9 is one of thirteen current townships in Benton County, Arkansas, USA.  As of the 2010 census, its total population was 31,362.

Geography

Cities, towns, and villages
Bentonville (most of)
Centerton (most of)
Highfill (small part of)

References
 United States Census Bureau 2008 TIGER/Line Shapefiles
 United States Board on Geographic Names (GNIS)
 United States National Atlas

 Census 2010 U.S. Gazetteer Files: County Subdivisions in Arkansas

External links
 US-Counties.com

Townships in Benton County, Arkansas
Townships in Arkansas